Peter Stuart Robert Marin (born 1978, Perth) is an Australian drummer and percussionist. Marin joined Dan Sultan's backing band in 2006 and is recorded on Sultan's albums, Get Out While You Can (November 2009), Blackbird (April 2014) and Killer (July 2017). He provided drums and percussion on United Kingdom artist, Passenger's albums, Whispers (June 2014), Whispers II (April 2015), Young as the Morning, Old as the Sea (September 2016), Runaway (August 2018) and Songs for the Drunk and Broken Hearted (January 2021).

Biography 

Peter Stuart Robert Marin (born 4 November 1978, Perth, Western Australia) is an Australian drummer and percussionist. From the age of six, he was raised in Essex, England before returning to Perth, aged 14. His father was a musician in a local covers band, and his mother was a visual artist. Marin started a Jazz course at UWA Conservatorium of Music but left to focus on his rock music career. He played in his father's covers band before relocating to Melbourne.

Marin formed Template, a progressive rock trio, in Melbourne in August 2001, with Michael Mills on guitar and vocals and Jarrod Ross on bass guitar. They issued their self-titled debut album in 2003. Its track, "Holly Wouldn't", co-written by Marin, was broadcast on national radio, Triple J.

Marin joined Dan Sultan's backing band in 2006 and is recorded on that artist's albums, Get Out While You Can (November 2009), Blackbird (April 2014) and Killer (July 2017). Marin joined Rogue Traders in 2008 and appeared on their album, Night of the Living Drums (November 2011). He provided drums and percussion on United Kingdom artist, Passenger's albums, Whispers (June 2014), Whispers II (April 2015), Young as the Morning, Old as the Sea (September 2016), Runaway (August 2018) and Songs for the Drunk and Broken Hearted (January 2021).

Additional credits 

Marin has also performed and recorded with the following acts:

 Gossling – If You Can Whistle (EP, 2009), Until Then (EP, 2010), International Living (EP, 2012), Harvest of Gold (2013)
 Stu Larsen – 'Vagabond' (2014)
 Dan Webb – Sandstorm (2014)
 Dave Arden – 'Freedom Called' featuring Paul Kelly
 Michael Paynter 
 Ross Hannaford (ex-Daddy Cool)
 Ross Wilson (ex-Daddy Cool)
 Emma Hewitt – Burn the Sky Down (2012)
 Bertie Blackman
 Karise Eden – Born to Fight (2018)
 Megan Washington
 Renee Geyer
 Ed Sheeran

References

External links 

 
 

1978 births
21st-century drummers
21st-century Australian male musicians
21st-century Australian musicians
Australian drummers
Living people
Male drummers
Musicians from Melbourne
Musicians from Perth, Western Australia